The men's 200 metres at the 1978 European Athletics Championships was held in Prague, then Czechoslovakia, at Stadion Evžena Rošického on 31 August, and 1 September 1978.

Medalists

Results

Final
1 September
Wind: -0.2 m/s

Semi-finals
31 August

Semi-final 1
Wind: -0.2 m/s

Semi-final 2
Wind: 0 m/s

Heats
31 August

Heat 1
Wind: 0.5 m/s

Heat 2
Wind: -1.5 m/s

Heat 3
Wind: -0.2 m/s

Heat 4
Wind: 0.2 m/s

Participation
According to an unofficial count, 26 athletes from 15 countries participated in the event.

 (2)
 (2)
 (3)
 (2)
 (1)
 (3)
 (1)
 (1)
 (2)
 (2)
 (2)
 (1)
 (1)
 (2)
 (1)

References

200 metres
200 metres at the European Athletics Championships